SW4 may refer to:

 SW4 in London, from the SW postcode area
 Toyota Fortuner, a mid-size SUV
 Star Wars Episode IV: A New Hope, a 1977 American epic space opera film written and directed by George Lucas
 Thanggam LRT station, Singapore

See also
 SWIV (1991 videogame), also called Silkworm IV (Silkworm 4)